Lee Chang-geun (born 30 August 1993) is a South Korean footballer who plays as a goalkeeper for Daejeon Hana Citizen.

Club career statistics
As of 25 April 2021

Honours
South Korea U-20
 AFC U-19 Championship: 2012

South Korea U-23
 King's Cup: 2015

External links 
 

1993 births
Living people
Association football goalkeepers
South Korean footballers
South Korea youth international footballers
South Korea under-20 international footballers
South Korea under-23 international footballers
South Korea international footballers
Busan IPark players
Suwon FC players
Jeju United FC players
Gimcheon Sangmu FC players
K League 1 players
K League 2 players